"I'm a Hustla" is a song by American rapper Cassidy that was the title track and lead single from his second studio album I'm a Hustla. The song was produced by Swizz Beatz and contains a sample from "Dirt off Your Shoulder" by Jay-Z. "I'm a Hustla" was released in the United States on February 28, 2005, and reached number 34 on the Billboard Hot 100.

Many remixes have been produced, featuring various alternate guests including Joe Budden and Jay-Z, the official remix features Mary J. Blige. Rapper Missy Elliott also made a freestyle version with DJ Khaled. In 2018, Beyoncé sampled "I'm a Hustla" for her Beychella performance.

Music video
The music video was directed by Benny Boom and features a cameo appearance by Swizz Beatz and Growing Up Gotti stars Carmine Agnello and John Agnello. In the music video, Cassidy dances the hustla dance later popularized as the motorcycle in Yung Joc's video for "It's Goin' Down".

Charts

Weekly charts

Year-end charts

References

External links
Cassidy at Myspace
Cassidy-I'm a Hustla music video

2004 songs
2005 singles
Cassidy (rapper) songs
Song recordings produced by Swizz Beatz
Music videos directed by Benny Boom
Songs written by Swizz Beatz
Songs written by Jay-Z